B-17 Gunner: Air War Over Germany is a 2001 video game from Infogrames. The game was endorsed by the 390th Bombardment Group, a veteran's group made up of members of one of the most decorated US squadrons from World War II.

Development
The game was announced in April 2001.

Reception

GameSpot gave the game a score of 3.7 out of 10 stating"Despite its simplicity, B-17 Gunner could have been an enjoyable, if mindless, arcade romp that you'd fire up for 20 minutes here and there to shoot down some planes and bomb some targets. Unfortunately, B-17 Gunner's numerous problems make it a product with little value, even at its reduced retail cost of $20"

References

2001 video games